Derek Simpson may refer to:

Derek Simpson (cellist) (1928–2007), English cellist
Derek Simpson (trade unionist) (born 1944), British trade union leader